Anaesthetis lanuginosa is a species of beetle in the family Cerambycidae. It was described by Baeckmann in 1903. It is known from Central Asia and Iran.

References

Desmiphorini
Beetles described in 1903